Irreligion in Kenya is uncommon among Kenyans, with only 1.6% claiming no religion. Atheism is greatly stigmatized in Kenya.

Harrison Mumia registered the first atheist society in Kenya on February 17, 2016. The Kenyan Government suspended the registration of the Atheists In Kenya Society barely three months after it was registered. Harrison Mumia moved to the High Court of Kenya to challenge the suspension of the society and won the case in February, 2018.

Demography 
According to the 2019 census, about 755,000 Kenyans identify as irreligious or atheist.  Atheist advocacy groups claim that the number of irreligious Kenyans is closer to 1.5 million.

List of non-religious Kenyans
 Barack Obama Sr.
 Richard Leakey
Harrison Mumia, President of the Atheists In Kenya Society
Ssemakula Mukiibi, Chairman of Freethinkers Kenya Association (FIKA)

See also
 Religion in Kenya
 Islam in Kenya
 Demographics of Kenya

References

External links
Atheists in Kenya

 
Religion in Kenya
Kenya